European Review of Social Psychology (ERSP) is an annual peer-reviewed scientific journal which publishes review articles in the field of social psychology. It was established in 1990 and is published by the Taylor & Francis imprint Psychology Press under the auspices of the European Association of Social Psychology. The editors-in-chief are Miles Hewstone (Oxford University) and Antony Manstead (Cardiff University). According to the Journal Citation Reports, the journal has a 2016 impact factor of 1.389.

Articles published in ERSP typically "review a programme of the author’s own research, as evidenced by the author's own papers published in leading peer-reviewed journals." The journal does not publish original empirical studies.

References

External links

Social psychology journals
Publications established in 1990
Taylor & Francis academic journals
Annual journals
Review journals
English-language journals
Academic journals associated with international learned and professional societies of Europe